The Château de Creil is an ancient fortified castle and a former royal residence located in Creil in the Oise department of the Hauts-de-France region of France. Only one tower remains.

History
In the 10th century, the lords of Senlis are recorded as having a fortified residence on the island of Saint-Maurice.

The English-garrisoned town and castle was besieged on 8 May 1441 by an army led by King Charles VII of France and a force of heavy artillery led by Jean Bureau. After two weeks the French artillery breached the walls. The garrison, led by Sir William Peyto, sallied out on 24 May but were unable to break the siege. They surrendered the town and castle the next day and retreated into Normandy.

Citations

References

Châteaux in Oise